Rein Taaramäe (born 24 April 1987) is an Estonian road bicycle racer, who currently rides for UCI WorldTeam .

Career

Cofidis (2008–14)
Taaramäe turned professional in 2008 for  after riding for the team as a stagiaire in late 2007 and winning a stage at the Circuit des Ardennes early in the season. In 2008 he won two stages of the Grand Prix du Portugal and a stage of the Tour de l'Avenir. At the 2008 Summer Olympics, Taaramäe competed in the road race and the road time trial.

In 2009 he finished third at the Tour de Romandie and eighth at the Tour de Suisse. Taaramäe won both the Estonian National Road Race Championships and the Estonian National Time Trial Championships. He also won the Tour de l'Ain after winning the last stage to Col du Grand Colombier. In 2010 he finished seventh at the Paris-Nice and third at the Volta a Catalunya.

In 2011, Taaramäe finished 11th overall in the Tour de France. He ultimately withdrew from the race prior to its conclusion in Madrid.

Astana (2015)
In August 2014  general manager Alexander Vinokourov announced that Taaramäe had signed a one-year contract with the team for the 2015 season.

2015 began well for Taaramäe with the victory at the Vuelta a Murcia. Hopes were high with Grand Tours in mind, especially the Tour de France. At the race, Taaramäe was meant to help Vincenzo Nibali in the mountains. Unfortunately Taaramäe was forced to abandon the race during stage 11 due to illness. After the disappointing Tour, Taaramäe went on to win in style back-to-back in the Vuelta a Burgos and the Arctic Race of Norway in August.

Team Katusha (2016–17)
He was named in the start list for the 2016 Giro d'Italia. He won the 20th stage of the race, becoming the first Estonian to win a stage in the Giro. After a short vacation at home in Estonia, Taaramäe went to win the overall at the Tour of Slovenia, together with a stage win on Stage 2.

Direct Ènergie (2018–2020)

During the 2018 Tour de France he had the opportunity to win stage 10, which would have given him a victory in all three  grand tours. This was a very competitive stage, the first in the high mountains of that year's edition and there were several dozen riders fighting to get into the breakaway right from kilometer zero. Taaramäe led the race near the end but was eventually caught and dropped by Julian Alaphilippe, who used his world class descending skills to steal the victory.

Taaramäe suffered dearly for his efforts and finished outside the time cut the following stage. He returned home to Estonia and took a break from cycling.

The following year his best place was 2nd overall in the Tour of Rwanda. His team, Direct Ènergie  was one of the Pro-Continental level teams that rode this 2.1 Africa Tour event, which they rode again in 2020 where he won the King of the Mountains competition.

Intermarché–Wanty–Gobert Matériaux (2021–Present)

Taaramäe had an opportunity to wear a leader's jersey in a grand tour for the first time in his career during the 2021 Giro d'Italia. On stage 4 he was involved in the breakaway and near the end of the stage was one of three riders also fighting for the stage win. Two riders, including eventual stage winner Joe Dombrowski, eventually caught the trio and dropped them. Taaramäe finished in the top 10 on the stage, his best result in a grand tour in several years.

During the 2021 Vuelta a España he got involved in the breakaway on stage 3. With 15km to go in the stage, before the start of the final climb he was among the final dozen or so riders fighting for the stage win. Dombrowski launched an attack with about 5km to go which only Kenny Elissonde, who was seeking his first stage victory in eight years, and Taaramäe answered. With 2.8km to go Taaramäe attacked and rode solo to the finish line claiming the victory. With this he also took the Red Jersey as well as the King of the Mountains jersey. He became the first rider from Estonia to ever lead the Vuelta and only the second Estonian rider to lead a grand tour following sprinter Jaan Kirsipuu, who led the Tour de France in 1999.

His team rode at the front of the race defending the leader's jersey for two stages and while he was involved in a crash, it was inside the final 3km of the stage and didn't affect the standings. He described the first day riding in the Red jersey as "beautiful" and would hold onto the mountains jersey for four stages. Later in the race he would ride in support of his teammate Odd Christian Eiking, who took over the leader's jersey in a similar manner following a breakaway on stage 10 putting the team back at the front of the race for several stages.

The 2022 Giro d'Italia made the third straight grand tour he entered where he had a realistic opportunity to wear the general classification jersey early in the race. On stage 4 he was out in the breakaway all day and survived longer than most; but ended up finishing just over +0:30 behind the winner as Richard Carapaz and the other GC contenders crossed about two minutes beyond him. He eventually fell back in the standings but rode strongly in support of Jan Hirt and Domenico Pozzovivo, both of whom finished in the top 10 overall as Intermarché finished 4th as a team.

Major results

2005
 3rd Overall Course de la Paix Juniors
2006
 1st  Time trial, National Under-23 Road Championships
 1st GP Ouest–France Espoirs
 1st Stage 1 Kreiz Breizh Elites
2007
 2nd  Time trial, UEC European Under-23 Road Championships
 2nd Time trial, National Road Championships
 2nd Les Boucles du Sud-Ardèche
 3rd Overall Kreiz Breizh Elites
 3rd Paris–Troyes
 5th Overall Circuit des Ardennes
1st Stage 4
 5th Boucle de l'Artois
2008
 1st Stage 6 (ITT) Tour de l'Avenir
 3rd Overall Grand Prix du Portugal
1st Stages 2 & 3
 8th Overall Circuit de la Sarthe
 9th Tartu GP
2009
 National Road Championships
1st  Time trial
1st  Road race
 1st  Overall Tour de l'Ain
1st Stage 5
 1st  Mountains classification, Tour of the Basque Country
 3rd Overall Tour de Romandie
 8th Overall Tour de Suisse
2010
 3rd Overall Volta a Catalunya
 7th Overall Paris–Nice
 9th Overall Route du Sud
 9th Trofeo Inca
2011
 1st  Time trial, National Road Championships
 1st Stage 14 Vuelta a España
 3rd Overall Critérium International
1st  Young rider classification
 4th Overall Paris–Nice
1st  Young rider classification
 5th Tartu GP
 8th Overall Volta ao Algarve
 10th Overall Circuit Cycliste Sarthe
2012
 National Road Championships
1st  Time trial
3rd Road race
 2nd Overall Vuelta a Andalucía
 3rd Overall Étoile de Bessèges
 6th Tallinn–Tartu GP
 8th Overall Tour du Poitou-Charentes
2013
 National Road Championships
1st  Road race
2nd Time trial
 3rd Cholet-Pays de Loire
2014
 1st Tour du Doubs
 2nd Overall Tour of Turkey
1st Stage 3
 6th Overall Tour du Limousin
 8th Overall Étoile de Bessèges
2015
 1st  Overall Vuelta a Burgos
1st Stage 2 (TTT)
 1st  Overall Arctic Race of Norway
 1st Vuelta a Murcia
 2nd Road race, National Road Championships
 6th Overall Volta ao Algarve
2016
 1st  Overall Tour of Slovenia
1st Stage 2
 1st Stage 20 Giro d'Italia
2017
 3rd Road race, National Road Championships
 9th Overall Tour of Guangxi
2018
 2nd Coppa Ugo Agostoni
 2nd Tour du Gévaudan Occitanie
 3rd Overall Vuelta a Aragón
 3rd Overall Tour de l'Ain
 3rd Tour du Doubs
 4th Famenne Ardenne Classic
2019
 1st  Time trial, National Road Championships
 2nd Overall Tour du Rwanda
 3rd Overall Tour de l'Ain
 3rd Overall Vuelta a Aragón
 3rd Mont Ventoux Dénivelé Challenge
2020
 1st  Mountains classification, Tour du Rwanda
2021
 1st  Time trial, National Road Championships
 Vuelta a España
1st Stage 3
Held  after Stages 3–4
Held  after Stages 3–6
 3rd Overall Czech Cycling Tour
2022
 1st  Time trial, National Road Championships
 8th Overall Tour of Oman
2023
 4th Overall Tour of Oman

Grand Tour general classification results timeline

References

External links

Rein Taaramäe's blog 

Palmarès by cyclingbase.com
Taaramae believes in top 10 placing at Tour de France Cyclingnews.com story in March 2011
Taaramae comes of age, still makes mistakes Cyclingnews.com story in March 2010

1987 births
Living people
Sportspeople from Tartu
Estonian male cyclists
Estonian Vuelta a España stage winners
Cyclists at the 2008 Summer Olympics
Cyclists at the 2016 Summer Olympics
Olympic cyclists of Estonia
Presidential Cycling Tour of Turkey stage winners
Estonian Giro d'Italia stage winners